Steven Dean Alvers (born April 4, 1957) is a former professional American football tight end and center who played in the National Football League (NFL) for the Buffalo Bills in 1981 and the New York Jets in 1982.

External links
NFL.com
Pro-Football-Reference

1957 births
Living people
Buffalo Bills players
Miami Hurricanes football players
New York Jets players
Players of American football from Florida
Sportspeople from Palm Beach, Florida
American football tight ends